The Singapore Association of the Visually Handicapped (SAVH) is a charitable organisation for the blind in Singapore. It was established in 1951 as the Singapore Association for the Blind. It is a registered charity with Institute of Public Character status.

The association has both blind and normal sighted members.

As of 2016, the association has 347 members.

See also
 List of disability organisations in Singapore
 List of voluntary welfare organisations in Singapore

References

External links
 

Non-profit organisations based in Singapore
Disability organisations based in Singapore
Special education schools in Singapore
1951 establishments in Malaya